Aşağı Əbdürrəhmanlı (also, Ashaga-Abdurakhmanly and Ashagy Abdurakhmanly) is a village in the Fuzuli District of Azerbaijan. It is currently uninhabited.

It was controlled by the Armenian Army from 1993 (following the First Nagorno-Karabakh War) until 2020.

On October 3, 2020, the Azerbaijani Ministry of Defence announced that the Azerbaijani Army had taken control of the village.

References 

Populated places in Fuzuli District